Rajinder Nagar Assembly constituency is one of the seventy Delhi assembly constituencies of Delhi and includes the neighborhood of Rajendra Nagar, Delhi. Rajinder Nagar assembly constituency is a part of New Delhi (Lok Sabha constituency).

Members of Legislative Assembly

^ by-poll

Election results

2022 by-election

2020

2015

2013

2008

2003

1998

1993

References

Assembly constituencies of Delhi
Delhi Legislative Assembly